Perumalpattu is a suburb of Chennai Indian state of Tamil Nadu. It is situated between Chennai and Arakkonam near the Chennai–Arakkonam railway line. It is a town in the suburb of Chennai. Once upon a time the villagers lived near the koovam river which passes adjacent to the village, a big flood happened in the river which has resulted the villagers to migrate to the current land. ( so in tamil "aaru peralapattadhinaal" its called as "peralapattu" and people later adated perumal name in to peralapattu and called "perumalpattu".

Etymology 
The name can be attributed to the existence of a famous old Perumal (Lord Vishu of Hindu Mythology) temple.

Geography

Government and politics

Civic Utility / Amenities / Services  

Perumalpattu rettaikulam (twin ponds) was restored in 2019 by the villagers themselves.

in 2020 the rettaikulam (twin ponds) thamaraikulam was given a fresh look by the best efforts by the village residents with the help of the NGO named (united way, chennai) the thamaraikulam got half KM of the walking path, saplings planted around the pond, solar lights, strong fence protecting the pond, children's park, floating garden etc.

Economy

Transport

By Air

By Rail  
The closest railway station is Veppampattu which is about 2 km from Perumalpattu and MTH Road serve as good transport from/to Chennai. Frequent electric train services are operated from Chennai.

By Road  
New Railway Over Bridge (ROB) across the railway track near Vepampattu railway station to link the transport between two major roads Chennai-Tiruttani Highway (NH-205) and Thiruvallur-Poonamalee High road (SH-50) through Perumalpattu road. 
Town can be approached by the Lucas - Thiruvallur high road or Poonamalle high road. 
Tamil Nadu Government has provided bus facility travel from Veppampattu to nearest town Poonamalee and to the Chennai shopping hub T. Nagar.

Education 
Raja National Mat.Hr.sec school, Sriram Vidya Manthir (CBSE & Matric), Gomathi vidhyalaya, Gnana Banu School and a few government schools are available. 

Sriram Engineering College

Adjacent communities

Reference 

Cities and towns in Tiruvallur district